Parag Tyagi is an Indian actor. He made his television debut as Vinod Karanjkar in Zee TV's Pavitra Rishta and went on to appear in Brahmarakshas, Jodha Akbar and Shakti Astitva Ke Ehsaas Ki. He is married to Shefali Zariwala. The two together participated in Nach Baliye. He has also worked in Hindi and Telugu cinema. His first film was A Wednesday (2008).

Filmography

Films

Television

References

Indian male television actors
Male actors from Mumbai
Living people
Place of birth missing (living people)
1974 births